Sam Millar (born 1955) is a crime writer and playwright from Belfast, Northern Ireland.

Millar was also a member of the Irish Republican Army from around the age of 15 after first seeing the events of Bloody Sunday and then, a few days after Bloody Sunday, a friend of Millar was killed. 

The school he attended was St Patrick's College, Belfast on Antrim Road, Belfast.

School classmates Joe Doherty, New lodge, Maxie Maxwell, Andersonstown, Hugh Connolly, New Lodge. Tommy Denver, New Lodge.

Bibliography
 Dark Souls
 On the Brinks
 The Redemption Factory
 The Darkness of Bones
 Bloodstorm : A Karl Kane Book
 The Dark Place : A Karl Kane Book
 The Dead of Winter : A Karl Kane Book
 Small Town Killing
 Brothers in Arms (stage play)
 The Bespoke Hitman

References

Living people
British crime fiction writers
Writers from Belfast
1955 births